The Second Battle of Mokra occurred on July 7, 1462, right before Skanderbeg's Macedonian campaign. Sultan Mehmed II had come out of his recent campaigns victorious, adding large swaths of lands to his domains. He was confident enough to send a new force into Albania to weaken the Albanian forces. He thus sent 23,000 men under Sinan bey to complete the job. Skanderbeg had been prepared and moved towards the Albanian frontier. The armies came near Mokra where Skanderbeg had positioned his forces on a mountain dominating the landscape. When the Turkish force got near enough, the Albanians ambushed and the Turks routed. Skanderbeg then raided Macedonia and shared the loot with his men.

Background 
From 1460–1462, Skanderbeg had been in Italy campaigning for Ferdinand, king of Naples, many of whose nobles supported an invasion by John d'Anjou, duke of Lorraine. Skanderbeg's assistance was pivotal, and he led the forces that finally crushed John at Troia on 18 August 1462. In the meantime, Mehmed had finally conquered the Peloponnese and Trebizond. Upon learning of Skanderbeg's presence in Italy, he sent an invasion force into Albania. Skanderbeg's wife, Donika, however, sent an urgent letter to Skanderbeg requesting for his return to Albania. Skanderbeg realized that he was needed at home so he left Ferrante to deal with the greatly weakened Angevin forces and boarded himself and his men for Albania.

Battle 
The sultan sent 23,000 cavalry under Sinan bey to combat Albanian forces. Skanderbeg quickly gathered 5,000 men from the country to fight along with 3,000 men that he used in Italy. With much caution, he went through the same road the Turks would use and positioned his men in a mountain in the Mokra valley where the Turks were expected to pass by. When the Turkish forces arrived, Skanderbeg ordered his men forward, beating drums and their swords together to create as much as possible to give an impression of a very large Albanian force. The Ottomans withdrew in disarray and the Albanian continued to pursue them, inflicting many casualties and capturing a multitude of prisoners.

Aftermath 
Skanderbeg pursued the Ottoman forces into Macedonia. Since the main Turkish force in the region had already been defeated, Skanderbeg continued to raid Macedonia and upon his return to Albania, he shared the loot with his men. Mehmed became angered at the defeat and the next month, he sent three separate Turkish armies into Macedonia in order to prepare for an invasion in force of Albania. Skanderbeg, instead, launched his own invasion, defeating each of the three armies before they set foot in Albania.

References 

Franco, Demetrio. Comentario de le cose de' Turchi, et del S. Georgio Scanderbeg, principe d' Epyr. Venice: Altobello Salkato, 1480.

Bibliography 

Mokra July 1462
Mokra July 1462
1462 in Europe
Mokra